Cowal and Bute Camanachd is a shinty club based in Dunoon, Cowal, Scotland.  The club fields a side in the Women's League and is the only shinty team at adult level operating in Dunoon.

History

The club was founded in 2003 and plays in Dunoon, there has historically not been shinty played in the town of Dunoon but the hinterland of the Cowal peninsula plays host to several illustrious clubs with male sides Kyles Athletic, Strachur and Col-Glen.

The club produced a naked calendar in 2006.

The team's catchment area includes the Isle of Bute and the Cowal peninsula.

At present there is no male team representing Dunoon in national shinty although there is a youth system in the town.

External links
Cowal & Bute @ the WCA
Club History

References

Shinty teams
Cowal